Salvia lyrata (lyre-leaf sage, lyreleaf sage, wild sage, cancerweed), is a herbaceous perennial in the family Lamiaceae that is native to the United States, from Connecticut west to Missouri, and in the south from Florida west to Texas. It was described and named by Carl Linnaeus in 1753.

Description
The leaves have irregular margins and are typically pinnately lobed or cut, looking somewhat like a lyre. The center vein is sometimes dark wine-purple. Flowering is heaviest between April and June, though sparse flowering can happen throughout the year. The leaves were once thought to be an external cure for cancer, thus one of the common names "Cancerweed". Salvia lyrata grows in full sun or light to medium shade, with native stands found on roadsides, fields, and open woodlands.

Cultivation and uses
Salvia lyrata is sometimes grown in gardens for its attractive foliage and flowers, though it can prolifically seed, easily becoming a lawn weed. Several cultivars have been developed with purple leaves. 'Burgundy Bliss' and 'Purple Knockout' are two cultivars with burgundy leaves that are deeper in color than the species. Native Americans used the root as a salve for sores, and used the whole plant as a tea for colds and coughs.

Gallery

Notes

External links
 IPNI Listing
 USDA Fact Sheet
 USDA Plant Profile
 University of Texas at Austin description 
 
 

lyrata
Flora of the Eastern United States
Plants described in 1753
Taxa named by Carl Linnaeus